As-Safira ( / ALA-LC: as-Safīrah; Aleppo dialect: Sfīre) is a Syrian city administratively belonging to the Aleppo Governorate. It is the administrative center of the as-Safira District.

Name
Medieval geographer Yaqut al-Hamawi spells the name Asfīrah, not as-Safira, which indicates that the definite article in the modern spelling is a result of hypercorrection.

As-Safira was known in pre-Islamic times as Sipri. Historians have suggested that the name Sipri may have come from the Akkadian word siparru meaning "bronze", which might indicate that copper was mined and bronze was worked there.

History
Since ancient times the city has been the distribution point for salt gathered from the nearby Sabkhat al-Jabbul.

Archeological findings

The Sfire I Treaty which may contain 8th century BCE evidence of a deity called "Most High."

Climate
As-Safira has a cold semi-arid climate (Köppen climate classification: BSk).

Notes

Bibliography

Cities in Syria
Populated places in al-Safira District